Lakes is a civil parish in the South Lakeland District of Cumbria, England. It contains 214 listed buildings that are recorded in the National Heritage List for England. Of these, six are listed at Grade I, the highest of the three grades, 20 are at Grade II*, the middle grade, and the others are at Grade II, the lowest grade.  Lakes is a large parish in the Lake District National Park containing the villages of Ambleside, Troutbeck, Rydal, Grasmere, Elterwater, and Chapel Stile, and the valleys of Great Langdale and Little Langdale.  Otherwise the parish is rural, including countryside, hills and mountains.  Many of the listed buildings are concentrated in the villages, with many dating from the 17th century, and others are scattered in the valleys.  Most of the listed buildings are houses and associated structures, shops, farmhouses, farm buildings, bridges, public houses and hotels, and churches with items in the churchyards.  Other listed buildings include a former Roman fort, an aqueduct, an AA telephone box, a market cross, and two war memorials.


Key

Buildings

Notes and references

Notes

Citations

Sources

Lists of listed buildings in Cumbria
South Lakeland District